Trigonopterus lombokensis is a species of flightless weevil in the genus Trigonopterus from Indonesia.

Etymology
The specific name is derived from that of the type locality.

Description
Individuals measure 1.71–2.06 mm in length.  General coloration is black, with rust colored tarsi and antennae.

Range

Phylogeny
T. lombokensis is part of the T. relictus species group.

References

lombokensis
Beetles described in 2014
Beetles of Asia
Insects of Indonesia